Coleophora conspersa is a moth of the family Coleophoridae. It is found in Turkey.

The larvae of the Coleophora conspersa feed on Phlomis lycia. They feed on the leaves of their host plant.

References

conspersa
Endemic fauna of Turkey
Moths described in 1999
Moths of Asia